The Best of the Rest is a compilation album by the band UFO released in 1988. As the title implies, it focuses on the post-Michael Schenker years.

Track listing
"The Writer" - 4:09 (from the album Mechanix)
"Mystery Train" - 3:54 (from the album No Place to Run)
"Makin Moves" - 4:44 (from the album The Wild, the Willing and the Innocent)
"Night Run" - 4:22 (from the album Misdemeanor)
"You and Me" - 3:18 (from the album Making Contact)
"Alpha Centauri" - 1:56 (from the album No Place to Run)
"Lettin' Go" - 4:01 (from the album No Place to Run)
"Something Else" - 3:19 (from the album Mechanix)
"Blinded by a Lie" - 4:01 (from the album Making Contact)
"Diesel in the Dust" - 4:21 (from the album Making Contact)
"Chains Chains" - 3:25 (from the album The Wild, the Willing and the Innocent)
"This Time" - 4:37 (from the album Misdemeanor)
"Back into My Life" - 4:53 (from the album Mechanix)
"The Way the Wind Blows" - 4:13 (from the album Making Contact)
"Money, Money" - 3:29 (from the album No Place to Run)
"Let It Rain" - 4:00 (from the album Mechanix)
"A Fool for Love" - 3:54 (from the album Making Contact)

References

1988 greatest hits albums
UFO (band) compilation albums
Chrysalis Records compilation albums